Robert Harvey "Bob" Paradise (born April 22, 1944) is an American former professional ice hockey defenseman who appeared in a total of 368 National Hockey League (NHL) regular season games between 1971 and 1979. Internationally, Paradise played for the American national team at the 1969 and 1977 World Championships, as well as at the 1968 Winter Olympics. He is a member of the United States Hockey Hall of Fame.

Playing career
Paradise originally signed as a free agent by the Montreal Canadiens after playing for the United States national team at the 1968 Winter Olympics and 1969 Ice Hockey World Championships. He was later traded to the Minnesota North Stars in 1971 where he made his NHL debut. He also played for the Atlanta Flames, Washington Capitals, and the Pittsburgh Penguins before retiring in 1979. He was also a member of the US national team at the 1977 Ice Hockey World Championship tournament.

Personal life
Paradise grew up in Saint Paul where he earned all-state honors in football and hockey while attending Cretin High School in Saint Paul. He also turned down a professional baseball contract from the Boston Red Sox in 1965, choosing instead complete his education at St. Mary's College. While at the school, Paradise continued to develop his hockey skills, becoming an all-conference performer in the Minnesota Intercollegiate Athletic Conference for four consecutive years.

Paradise is the son-in-law of United States Hockey Hall of Famer Bob Dill. His brother Dick Paradise is also a former professional hockey player.

Career statistics

Regular season and playoffs

International

Transactions
June, 1970 – Signed as a free agent by Montreal.
May, 1971 – Traded to Minnesota by Montreal with the rights to Gary Gambucci for cash.
June 6, 1972 – Traded to Atlanta by Minnesota for cash.
January 4, 1974 – Traded to Pittsburgh by Atlanta with Chuck Arnason for Al McDonough.
November 26, 1975 – Traded to Washington by Pittsburgh for Washington's 2nd round choice (Greg Malone) in 1976 Amateur Draft.
October 1, 1977 – Traded to Pittsburgh by Washington for the rights to Don Awrey.

References

External links
 

1944 births
Living people
American men's ice hockey defensemen
Atlanta Flames players
Binghamton Dusters players
Cleveland Barons (1937–1973) players
Ice hockey people from Saint Paul, Minnesota
Ice hockey players at the 1968 Winter Olympics
Minnesota North Stars players
Montreal Voyageurs players
Muskegon Mohawks players
Olympic ice hockey players of the United States
Omaha Knights (CHL) players
Pittsburgh Penguins players
Seattle Totems (WHL) players
Springfield Indians players
United States Hockey Hall of Fame inductees
Washington Capitals players